Carsten Sträßer (born 5 July 1980) is a German former professional footballer who played as a midfielder.

Career
Sträßer was born in East Berlin.

He joined Chemnitzer FC from Carl Zeiss Jena in 2010.

Personal life
He is the son of the East Germany national player Ralf Sträßer.

References

External links
 
 

1980 births
Living people
German footballers
Association football midfielders
Germany youth international footballers
FC Carl Zeiss Jena players
FC Erzgebirge Aue players
SpVgg Unterhaching players
FC Rot-Weiß Erfurt players
SSV Jahn Regensburg players
Hertha BSC II players
Chemnitzer FC players
Wormatia Worms players
2. Bundesliga players
3. Liga players
Regionalliga players
Footballers from Berlin